The 1997 New Orleans Saints season was the franchise’s 31st season in the National Football League, and 24th at the Louisiana Superdome. The team improved upon its 1996 record of 3–13, winning six games, but failed to qualify for the playoffs for the fifth consecutive season.

This was the Saints’ first season with Mike Ditka as head coach. New Orleans hired the former Chicago Bears head coach after Ditka had spent the previous four seasons as a studio analyst for NBC Sports.

Offseason

NFL Draft

Personnel

Staff

Roster

Regular season

Schedule

Standings

References 

 Saints on Pro Football Reference
 Saints on jt-sw.com

New Orleans Saints
New Orleans Saints seasons
New